Jukić (anglicized as Jukic) is a Serbo-Croatian surname, a patronymic, derived from Juko, itself a diminutive of Juraj. It is predominantly borne by ethnic Croats.

It is the second most common surname in the Split-Dalmatia County of Croatia.

It may refer to:

Andrija Jukic (born 1987), Australian footballer
Darko Jukić (born 1990), Danish basketballer
Dinko Jukić (born 1989), Croatian-born Austrian swimmer
Elmir Jukić, Bosnian film director
Ivan Jukić (rower), Croatian rower
Ivan Jukić (water polo player),  Croatian water polo player
Ivan Franjo Jukić (1818–1857), writer from Bosnia and Herzegovina
Ivo Jukić (born 1986), Croatian futsal player 
Jorge Jukich (born 1943), Uruguayan former cyclist
Katarina Jukic (born 1989), Australian footballer
Mirna Jukić (born 1986), Austrian swimmer of Croatian origin
Paškal Jukić (1748–1806), Croatian preacher, musician, and professor of philosophy
Stjepan Jukić (born 1979), Croatian footballer
Vince Jukic (born 1980), drummer from Adelaide, Australia
Zarko Jukic (born 1993), Danish basketballer

See also
Jokić
Đukić

References

Croatian surnames
Patronymic surnames